The Padlock (Italian: Lo catenaccio) is a literary fairy tale written by Giambattista Basile in the Pentamerone, as the ninth story of the second day.

The tale is related to the international cycle of the Animal as Bridegroom or The Search for the Lost Husband, where a heroine loses her husband and must search for him.

Summary 

A woman lives in poverty with her three daughters. One day, she sends her daughters to fetch water for them, but her elders try to make the other go in their place. Luciella, the youngest, takes the jug and goes to fetch water herself. At the fountain, she meets a "handsome slave", who makes a proposition for her: if she comes to live with him in a nearby cave, the man will wash her in pretty things.

Luciella agrees to his offer, but goes back home to deliver the water to her mother. The girl then accompanies the slave to a nearny cave: inside, an underground palace, filled with gold. She sleeps in an ornate bed, and, after the candles are put out, someone joins her in bed. This continues on for some days.

One day, Luciella begins to miss home, and the slave agrees to let her pay a visit to her relatives, but bids her not to tell anything about her new life. The girl obeys at first: she visits her family, but remains steadfast to her mother and sisters's questions and goes back to the underground palace. She visits them time and time again, jealousy creeping even greater in their hearts. The fourth time, Luciella's mother and sisters tell her her mysterious bedmate must be a handsome man with a padlock on his body, and convince her to light a candle to check on this padlock.

Moved by her family's words, Luciella returns home and retires to the bedchambers that same night. She is given a sleeping draught, but tosses its contents away and pretends to fall asleep. While her bedmate is asleep, she lights a candle and confirms her family's story: her companion is a handsome youth, and there is a padlock on him. Luciella opens it and sees some women with skeins, one dropping one of the skeins. Luciella, kind that she was, shouts out for the woman to get the skein she dropped, but her voice wakes up the companion at her bedside. Feeling betrayed, the youth commands some female slaves to dress Luciella in rags and to throw her out of the palace and into the woods.

Heavily pregnant and abandoned by her husband, Luciella wanders to the city of Torre-Longa, where she takes shelter with the local queen and gives birth to a beautiful baby in the stables. That same night, a man comes at night and rocks the baby with a song, saying that, if the crows never crowed, he would stay by his son's side. However, as soon as morning comes, the rooster crows and the youth disappears. This goes on for some more days, until the queen's maid witnesses the event and reports to the queen the finding. The queen issues an edict for all roosters to be killed around the city, following the youth's instructions. The next time, the youth appears again, but, this time, the rooster does not crow. The queen embraces the youth, who she recognizes as her son, and breaks his curse. Luciella regains her husband, and the queen is happy she gained a grandson and her son back.

Analysis

Tale type 
The tale belongs to the international cycle of The Search for the Lost Husband which corresponds, in the international Aarne-Thompson-Uther Index, to type ATU 425 and its subtypes. The second revision of the index, made in 1961 by scholar Stith Thompson, referred to the tale as "Pentamerone II, No. 9" and listed it under subtypes 425E and 425L.

ATU 425E 
Nancy Canepa indexes it as subtype ATU 425E, "Enchanted Husband Sings Lullaby". In this type, the heroine's husband has a padlock on his body; after she betrays his trust, she is expelled and takes shelter in a castle where she gives birth to their child; at night her husband comes to lull the baby with a song in which there are instructions on how to save him.

According to Jan-Öjvind Swahn and Hans-Jörg Uther, Lo Catenaccio is the oldest example of type ATU 425E.

AaTh 425L 
The tale could also be classified as type AaTh 425L, "The Padlock on the Enchanted Husband", or "The Husband with a Lock in his Navel", according to American folklorist D. L. Ashliman. In subtype AaTh 425L, the heroine discovers a padlock or keyhole on her husband's body; she opens it and sees strange sights within; her scream alerts the enchanted husband, who expels his (pregnant) wife. However, German folklorist Hans-Jörg Uther, in his 2004 revision of the international index, subsumed type AaTh 425L under new type ATU 425E.

Motifs 
Scholar , in his monograph about Cupid and Psyche, remarked that the heroine's pregnancy was an "essential" trait of subtype AaTh 425L.

According to Italian literary critic  and Anna Buia, the prince's lullaby from Basile's tale is "preserved" in most of the subsequent variants.

The crowing of the rooster 
Although they acknowledged that the crowing of the rooster marks type AaTh 425E, Mario Lavagetto and Anna Buia, as well as folklorist Letterio Di Francia, remarked that the motif is "widespread" in Italian tradition. In this regard, German folklorist  noted that the rooster's crowing in Basile's tale acquires a negative conotation, since it helps prolong the prince's enchantment, and only by having the roosters killed can he be saved in a more permanent manner. Similarly, according to Di Francia, there is a widespread belief across Italy that the rooster's crowing facilitates the action of supernatural beings, and spells can be broken only by ceasing their singing.

Variants 
Nancy Canepa locates similar stories in Turkey and Greece, and supposes that Basile's tale may have originated from this region. Likewise, according to the Greek Folktale Catalogue, type 425E is "popular" in Turkey and Greece, while type 425L is known across the Greek Aegean Islands and in Asia Minor. On the other hand, Swahn restricted the former subtype to Italy and Catalonia.

Italy 
The "Istituto centrale per i beni sonori ed audiovisivi" ("Central Institute of Sound and Audiovisual Heritage") promoted research and registration throughout the Italian territory between the years 1968–1969 and 1972. They also reported a single variant of subtype 425L, Il lucchetto sul marito incantato, which they also classified as the former.

Author Angelo de Gubernatis reported an unpublished Italian tale collected by one S. M. Greco from Cosenza, Calabria. In this tale, a girl pulls up a rampion and finds a staircase leading to an underground palace, where some fairies live. The fairies take her in, and at night the girl hears a noise every night. She later visits her family and goes back to the palace, where she lights a candle to better see who comes at night to her bed (following her mother's advice). She sees a handsome youth with a looking glass on his breast, and accidentally drops some candlewax on his body. He wakes up and banishes the girl, but the fairies help her and give her a ball of yarn for her to throw and follow. The girl uses the yarn and reaches a castle in a city who is mourning for the loss of their prince. The local queen takes in the girl and she gives birth to a boy. Some time later, a shoemaker appears and begins to sing at night how the girl's son is also his. The girl tells the queen the shoemaker is the lost prince, and they can save him by tricking him into thinking it is still night before he disappears. Thus, the queen kills every rooster in the city and covers the windows with veils painted black with diamonds. Tricked into staying long after the sunrise, the prince is saved and marries the girl.

King Animmulu 
Scholar Jack Zipes translated a Sicilian tale collected by Giuseppe Pitrè. In this tale, titled Lu re d’Anìmmulu ("King Animmulu"), a poor shoemaker lives with his three daughters Peppa, Nina and Nunzia. One day, Nunzia finds a large fennel plant in the forest and tries to pull it, without luck, so her father helps her. They pull it and see a doorway and a young man. The pair explain to the youth that they were just gathering some herbs for a soup, and the youth makes a proposition: he shall take Nunzia and make her father rich. The pair agree, and Nunzia goes with the youth to live in his lavish underground palace. Some time later, Peppa convinces her father to let her pay a visit to Nunzia. Their father takes her there, and Peppa enters the underground palace. Nunzia welcomes her and asks her to comb her hair. While doing it, she finds a key in her hair, which she takes while Nunzia is asleep. Peppa uses the key to open a secret room; inside, pretty young women doing embroidery for Nunzia's unborn child, but, as soon as they see Peppa, their faces turn old and ugly. Peppa closes the door and wakes her sister up, asking her to be guided out of the palace. She explains she opened the forbidden door, and Nunzia says she is now lost. Peppa departs. The pretty young women, who are fairies, order Nunzia's husband to banish her. With no other option, the youth banishes a pregnant Nunzia, but gives her a silver yarn, for her to throw it and follow it. Nunzia complies with his decision, but follows his advice and reaches King Animmulu's mother's castle, where she is given shelter. Nunzia gives birth to a son, whom a maidservant recognizes as the spitting image of the queen's son. She goes to inform the queen. Meanwhile, back to the underground palace, the fairies inform King Animmulu that Nunzia gave birth to his son, and suggest they pay them a visit. King Animmulu enters Nunzia's chambers and sings a lullaby to their baby, while the fairies dance outside and sing about how the dawn has not come yet. King Animmulu disappears with the fairies in the morning. The next night, King Animmulu comes again and Nunzia asks him how they can defeat the fairies; he answers: they must stop the crows from singing, muffle the bells and clocks, and erect a dark canvas around the castle painted like the night sky to trick the fairies so they think it is not yet dawn. Nunzia and the queen follow his instructions and prepare the canvas for the following night: the fairies dance, thinking it is still night, until the queen's servants draw out the canvas when the sun is in mid-heaven; the fairies then change into snakes and lizards. King Animmulu is free at last and lives with Nunzia, his son and his mother. Italian author Italo Calvino reworked the tale and adapted it as Il figlio del Re nel pollaio ("The King's Son in the Henhouse"), where the enchanted prince is called Re Cristallu ("King Crystal"). Calvino also sourced the tale from Salaparuta.

L'Ombrion 
Author  colected a tale from Firenze with the title L'Ombrion, which Imbriani related to Lo Catenaccio. In this tale, a man has three daugthers and is so poor he lived on alms. One day, the man finds a lush garden and fetches some herbs, when a man appears to him like an ombre (a shadow). The somber creature asks the man the purpose of his visit, and demands one of his daugthers be delivered to him, unless he wishes to forfeit his life. The old man returns home and asks which of daughters will go to the ombre to save their father's life: the elder two refuse, while the youngest agrees to go with him. The old man takes his youngest to the ombre, and they descend a staircase to splendid underground quarters, where they begin to live together. However, the girl is forbidden to light any candle in their quarters, and she senses someone snoring at her side. One day, the girl begins to miss home, and the ombrion allows her to visit her sisters for a period of 24 hours, then she must be back. The girl visits her sisters and is given a candle to use at night when she goes back to her mysterious husband. She follows her sisters' suggestion and finds a handsome youth beside her, with a key next to his neck. She steals the key and uses it to open the doors of the underground palace, where she finds women working in some preparations for the king's son. She leaves the door and her husband, the youth, banishes her from his palace, but advises her to go to the king's court, where she will be given lodge and whose royal family is searching for him. While the girl is away at the castle, the youth resumes the ombrion form and converses to a magical lantern about his wife. One night, the lantern tells him his wife is sleeping soundly, and he sings a poem about if the roosters cannot crow and the bells cannot ring, then he will remain. A servant of the castle listens to the song another night and reports to the king, who fulfills the command: he orders the roosters to be killed all over the kingdom and bells to be muffled. The next morning, the servants enter the girl's room with breakfast, and sees a man by her side. The king comes to her room and recognizes the man as his son, and marries him to the girl.

The Celery 
Austrian philologist  collected and translated a tale from Wälschtirol with the title Der Selleri (Lo sellem; The Celery). In this tale, a father has three daughters, and asks them to fetch some rice for him, because he wants some soup. The elder daughter finds a bush of celery in their garden and tries to pull it, but cannot do so. The middle sister joins and tries to help her, to no avail. The third sister, also the youngest and the most beautiful, decides to pull the herb herself, but instead she is pulled down into the ground, and reaches a meadow in front of a castle. The girl enters the castle and is welcomed by a small man with a large beard. They live together in the underground castle, but the man forbids her to open a certain door. One day, however, while the small man is away, the girl opens the forbidden room and discovers women preparing linen clothes, and sees a cradle of pure gold. The girl asks whom the women are preparing for, and the women retort in a harsh answer that everything was for her. The girl locks the door behind her and the old man appears to her, explaining he is an enchanted prince who was just about to be free from his curse, but his companion betrayed him. The girl leaves the palace and wanders off until she reaches a castle where she is given lodge by the queen. Some time later, the girl gives birth to a son, who is cared for by two nursemaids. One night, the old man talks to his magic lantern about his wife and son, and visits their chambers in the castle. While there, he sings a lullaby and mentions that he would be with his son if the rooster never crowed and the bells never rang the hours. This happens on the following two nights, and the queen, on the third night, manages to run after before he vanishes and grabs a celery he left behind. The next morning, the queen, advised by the nursemaids, throws the celery in the fireplace. All of a sudden, the sounds of trampling horses and a carriage are heard approaching the castle: it is the queen's son, the prince, released from his curse.

The Golden Cabbage 
Italian anthropologist  collected a tale from Abruzzo with the title Il Cavolo d'Oro ("The Golden Cabbage"). In this tale, a poor mother has three daughters, and they all scavenge for food by gathering herbs. One day, the youngest daughter finds a golden cabbage in the fields and plucks its foliage to bring it home. By selling the gilded foliage, the family becomes rich. They decide to have the entire vegetable to themselves, and the third daughter goes to uproot it. She does and opens up a hole on the ground which she enters. She finds a fairy palace whose mistress appears and orders the girl on tasks: first, to separate a mixed heap of beans and fava beans; next, to separate a mixed heap of corn and wheat. With the help of a chained prince's son, the girl fulfills both tasks. Some time later, the girl asks the fairies to visit her family, and the fairies allow it. She goes back home and talks to her family about sleeping with a mysterious person at night she has never seen, because she is given a sleeping drink. Her sisters advise her to toss away the drink and hide a lit candle nearby. The girl goes back home and follows her sisters' instructions: with the candle, she finds a youth beside her on the bed, with two mirros on his knees. Reflected in the mirrors are women preparing clothes for the prince's wife, and one of them washes some in a river. The girl shouts for the washerwoman to mind her clothes, and her screams wake up the prince, who laments that she betrayed his trust, for the fairies will banish her. The prince gives a ball of yarn to help his wife, who is expelled by the fairies to the wide world. Fortunately, she throws the yarn and follows it to a castle where she is given lodge for the night. She gives birth to a boy in the stables, and stays there. One night, the prince visits them in secret and sings a song to his son, about how he would be with him if the rooster did not crow and midnight did not ring, then disappears. The queen is informed of the prince's night visits to the girl, and hatches a plan to release her son: she has soldiers at the ready for the youth's next visit; he appears with chains around his body and, when the fairies try to pull him back, the soldiers cut off the chains, releasing him from the fairies' grasp.

The Story of Oimè 
Folklorist Giuseppe Pitrè collected a Tuscan tale titled La Novella di Oimè ("The Story of Oimè"). In this tale, a queen is very stingy and tries to be charitable to have a son. She gives alms to a poor old lady in church, and, after the third time, the old lady declares the queen will bear a son, but she will not be able to enjoy motherhood for long. It happens thus: a prince is indeed born and named "Oimè", but some time later, a dog enters the castle and kidnaps the baby. Years later, a poor widowed father lives with his three daughters and scavenges food for them by gathering herbs. One day, he finds a lush garden in a villa, steals some vegetables and sells them in the marketplace. He returns later to steal some more, and tries to uproot a particularly sturdy vegetable. Failing that, he sits a while and utters a sigh: "Oimè". A man appears from the villa window and asks if the man summoned him, for that is his name. Oimè discovers the man is his salad thief, and demands one of his three daughters in payment, saying he will pay him a visit and choose his bride in person. The man's elder daughters lock their sister to try and deceive Oimè, but he asks to see the third daughter. The girl appears, and Oimè takes her as his bride to his palace. In the palace, Oimè tells the girl the palace is also hers, but a specific room is strictly forbidden. Time passes, and the girl's sisters pay her a visit. The girl mentions the secret door, and the sisters convince her to open it. After they leave, that same night, the girl steals a key and opens the forbidden door. Inside, she finds a long corridor where woman are preparing a trousseau for Oimè's unborn son. When she reaches the last room, the woman shouts that their work was for her, and, calling the girl ungrateful, expels the girl, and the palace disappears, leaving her in the woods. The girl, pregnant, sees a light in the distance, and reaches a castle where she is given lodge by the queen. She gives birth to a son, and she is secretly visited by Oimè. Two nursemaids see the youth talking to a magic lantern, and rocking the baby with a song that laments that if the roosters never crowed and the bells never rang, he would be happy. On the following nights, the queen is informed about the youth's visit and stays awake to see him: she recognizes it is her own son, and goes to embrace him before he vanishes with the dawn. The sun rises, and the prince remains with the queen, breaking the curse cast by the old lady.

Spain 
Catalan scholars  and  register a similar type in the index of Catalan rondallas ('fairy tales'), with the typing 425E, El príncep encantat canta una cançó de bressol. According to Catalan philologist Caterina Valriu, the tale type is present only in Mallorca.

Americas 
Brazilian author Marco Haurélio collected and published a Portuguese language tale from Bahia with the title Angélica Mais Afortunada (O Príncipe Teiú). In this tale, a man has three daughters. One day, he goes to hunt in the woods, but cannot catch anything, so he sits down to curse his bad luck. Suddenly, a teiú (a type of lizard) comes to him and asks what is wrong. The hunter explains his situation, and the teiú offers to provide the man with game, but demands a payment, to which the man agrees to give in exchange the first thing that greets him when he goes back home. Thinking he made a great deal, he returns home and is greeted by his youngest daughter Angélica. Her father tries to trick the lizard by sending his little she-dog, but the teiú senses the trick, and demands Angélica be given to him. The girl agrees to go with the lizard, and her father accompanies her to meet the teiú. She enters a hole in the ground that connects to a badly illuminated house, where she lives with a voice that comes at night to her bed. Some time later, she begins to miss her family, and the voice allows her to visit her father and sisters. Angélica goes home and tells her father about the mysterious bedmate, and her father gives her a match and a candle she can use to see him at night. Angélica returns to her house and lights a candle on her companion: instead of a teiú, she finds a handsome youth. She stares at his face for a long time she does not see that a drop of candlewax falls on his body. The youth wakes up and admonishes his wife that his curse was nearly lifted, but now she will have to search for him in his kingdom. Angélica leaves the house and wanders off until she finds an old woman's hut where she can give birth to her child. The old woman, suspecting she is the teiú's wife, goes to the castle to inform the king, who orders the old woman to wait on Angélica until she gives birth. It happens as ordered. That same night, the teiú creeps into the room to see his wife and newborn son, and sings a song to the boy about he, the father, would be with him, had the rooster not crowed, the donkey not whinnied, and the bell not rung, and disappears. The old woman sleeps through the whole scene. The event happens again in the following night. On the third night, the teiú takes his son in his arms, and sings him a song about how the rooster had crowed, the donkey had whinnied and the bell had rung, and he stayed with his son with the dawn. The teiú's curse is lifted, and he goes to live with his wife and son in his father's castle.

See also 
 Filek-Zelebi (Greek folktale)

References

External links 
 Italian text of Lo Catenaccio in Italian Wikisource

Italian fairy tales
ATU 400-459

de:Der Riegel